Somangira is an administrative ward in the Kigamboni District  of  Dar es Salaam Region, Tanzania. According to the 2002 census, the ward has a total population of 10,799.

References

Temeke District
Wards of Dar es Salaam Region